The Hinode Bridge (known during the construction phase as the Comoro Bridge III) is a two-lane road bridge in the suco of , a western suburb of Dili, capital city of East Timor.  It was built by a Japanese company, between 2016 and 2018, with grant aid funding from the Government of Japan.

Location
It connects the Avenida de Hudi-Laran in the east with the National Highway 3 in the west.

History
In 2013, the government of East Timor opened the first stage of the new bridge later named the CPLP Bridge, and thereby expanded the number of road lanes crossing the Comoro River from two to four. However, as the Asian Development Bank (ADB) had forecast an increase in traffic demand in East Timor for the period 2010–2019, the government also asked the government of Japan to construct an additional bridge upriver of the four lane bridge.

In response, the Japan International Cooperation Agency (JICA) despatched a preparatory survey team to East Timor to carry out a field survey in June/July 2013.

The upriver bridge, then known as the "Comoro Bridge III", was built by Tobishima Corporation of Japan, with a consortium of Ingérosec Corporation, Nippon Engineering Consultants Co., Ltd. and Idea Consultants, Inc. as consultants.  The bridge's construction was funded by the Government of Japan, which, through JICA, made available grant aid of up to 2.605 billion yen (approximately US$23.7 million).

Work began in mid 2016, and the ceremonial laying of the foundation stone took place on 17 October 2016. As part of the work, the new access roads proposed in the field survey report were constructed, including a road near the Tasi Tolu area and a new connection to the roundabout outside the Presidente Nicolau Lobato International Airport. The project employed 37 foreigners, 15 local engineers and more than a hundred local workers.

The bridge was opened to traffic on 13 September 2018, a month behind schedule. The official opening ceremony was held on 12 October 2018, during a visit to East Timor of the Japanese Foreign Minister Tarō Kōno.  The East Timorese officials who attended were Prime Minister Taur Matan Ruak, Transport and Communications Minister José Agustinho da Silva, and Public Works Minister Salvador Soares dos Reis Pires.

At the opening ceremony, the official name of the structure, "Hinode Bridge", was announced.  The Japanese word "hinode" means "rising sun", an expression used to refer both to Japan (the "Land of the Rising Sun") and to East Timor (the Tetum word for "East", Loro Sa'e, literally means "rising sun").

Description

The bridge was intended to be a new alternative route across the river to accommodate increasing traffic between Dili's city centre in the east and its western suburban area, which includes the International Airport and the new seaport at Tibar Bay. It was expected that the bridge would reduce traffic across the CPLP Bridge. Additionally, the bridge is now part of the Mikrolet (minibus) line 11, which connects Manleuana Market with Tasi Tolu.

References

Bridges in East Timor
Buildings and structures in Dili
Infrastructure completed in 2018